Wilhelmena Rhodes Kelly (née Rhodes December 11, 1946 – October 16, 2019) was an African-American genealogist who traced her American lineage to the April 5, 1614 union of Pocahontas and John Rolfe. She was also a member of the Jamestowne Society. In 2019 she became the New York State Regent and a member of the National Board of Management, highest ranking woman of color in the National Society Daughters of the American Revolution (NSDAR), since its founding in 1890. She was a pioneer of African-American genealogy. Born and raised in Brooklyn, she was a local Brooklyn historian and member of the Society of Old Brooklynites (SOB), one of the borough's oldest civic organizations. She was the author of books on Bedford-Stuyvesant as well as the Crown Heights and Weeksville sections of Brooklyn, and family genealogy books tracing her family's American roots.

Early life and education 
Wilhelmena Rhodes Kelly was born in Brooklyn, on December 11, 1946 to George Morrell Rhodes, Jr. (born 1921) and Dorothy Hamlin Rhodes (born 1924) She was the second of two children joining her older sister, Linda Marie (born 1944).  The surname Kelly, acquired through an early unsuccessful marriage, was retained throughout her life.

As a child, she was nicknamed "Mena". She attended Brooklyn neighborhood public schools; Lefferts Junior High School, Erasmus Hall High School and Brooklyn College (class of 1970).

Wilhelmena Rhodes Kelly was the third generation of her family to live in Brooklyn. Her grandparents had bought a brownstone in Bedford-Stuyvesant in 1932, and she was raised there until the age of thirteen when the family moved to Union Street in the Crown Heights section of the borough. The Brooklyn Historical Society interviewed her about her childhood experiences for their Crown Heights Oral History Project. Based upon her personal and historical knowledge of these Brooklyn areas, she later wrote about Bedford-Stuyvesant and Crown Heights, two historically Black sections of Brooklyn. These books contain both personal and archival photographs of the borough.

The importance of community activism through participation in civic life, and service to country was taught to Wilhelmena at a young age.  While living at the Union Street home, the young Wilhelmena participated in Brooklyn Day and Concord Baptist Church of Christ Sunday School.

An avid reader, she was especially drawn to books on history.  At home, this manifested itself in her questions to her paternal grandparents about what it was like growing up in the 1890s American South, then making the move in 1930 to New York City during the Great Migration, a time period from 1916–1970 during which approximately 6 million African Americans migrated to urban Northeast location from the Southern United States. These tales also led to her life-long interest in Brooklyn history and the African American community.

She was fascinated by the genealogy work of her mother and uncle, John “Dukie” Hamlin on the Hamlin family of Virginia, who hired a professional genealogist in the 1970s to trace the family history. She later traced her interest in genealogy to these incidents.

Her father, George Rhodes, was a resident of Bedford-Stuyvesant whom graduated from Boys High School and Brooklyn Polytechnic Institute. He qualified for the special Army Air Force Program at Tuskegee Institute.  Lt. Rhodes won distinction as a member of the Tuskegee Airmen.  His military exploits in an air battle in Europe were celebrated on the front page of the Amsterdam News on August 26, 1944.

Lineage organizations

Jamestowne Society
Wilhelmena Rhodes Kelly became a member of the Jamestowne Society in 2007, tracing her American lineage to Pocahontas and John Rolfe. The Jamestowne Society is an educational, historical, and patriotic organization dedicated to discovering and recording the names of those early settlers, recording their deeds, and promoting the restoration of historical records and artifacts. She served the New York Company as its Governor for one term from early 2017 until March 30, 2019. In July 2019, she attended the 400th Anniversary of the First Meeting of the General Assembly speaking in recognition of the "20 and odd" Africans brought to Virginia in 1619. Her remarks were published in full in the Fall 2019 issue of the Jamestowne Society Magazine, Volume 43, number 2.

National Society Daughters of the American Revolution

Wilhelmena Rhodes Kelly traced the family on her mother's side to Revolutionary War patriot Stephen Henry Hamlin of Prince George County. As a Quaker and farmer, Stephen H. Hamlin did not actively participate in battles. He is documented as providing critical goods in supports of the American Revolution. These included: 1 horse (age 6 years), 3 "beeves" (750 pounds of beef), 3 sheep, 135 bushels of corn, 600 pounds of fodder, and an additional 590 bushels of corn. This aid delivered to the fight for freedom qualified the family to file for membership in the National Society Daughters of the American Revolution (NSDAR).

Wilhelmena Rhodes Kelly joined the Manhattan Chapter of the DAR in July 2004, eventually becoming Chapter Regent. In July 2012, she was the Organizing Regent for the Increase Carpenter Chapter of DAR, located in Jamaica, Queens, New York. In that capacity, she often served as a link between the Borough of Queens and its colonial history. That first year, she was a guest at the Kingsland Homestead in Flushing, Queens, site of the Weeping Beech, the mother of all European weeping beeches in the United States. Here, she presented a Newtown Pippen apple tree to the Queens Historical Society on behalf of the chapter. The tree was deemed the official apple of New York City in 2009 by a New York City Council resolution.

Within DAR, she served as National Chairman of Public Relations and Media, National Vice Chairman of the Commemorative Events Committee, during which she designed a tri-color flag in recognition of the tenth anniversary of the September 11 attacks in 2011. She was often referred to as "a walking goodwill ambassador" for the DAR in recognition of her constant speaking engagements, teaching at genealogy workshops and willingness to help others construct their family histories. Her efforts are unofficially thought to have led 100 women to successfully complete paperwork required to join the NSDAR. 
She became the highest ranking woman of color in the history of the DAR, founded in 1890, and a member of the National Board of Management. She was installed as New York State Regent in June 2019. Her New York State Regent theme was "Serving and Soaring in the Empire State." Her New York State Regent symbol was a pair of wings with a dangling pearl.

Professional genealogical researcher 
Wilhelmena helped over one hundred women with genealogical research, identifying their descent from an American patriot who fought or rendered service in the Revolution, and qualifying them as members of the NSDAR.  She was a member of the Association of Professional Genealogists-New York Company (APG-NY.) She helped found the Macon Library Branch of the African-Atlantic Genealogical Society (AAGS), and worked with the Weeksville Heritage Society and the Afro-American Historical and Genealogical Society (AAHGS.)

Death 
During the summer of 2019, she was diagnosed with kidney cancer.  During the final months of her life, she was cared for by her sister, Linda, and her “forever friend,” Tony Wilkins. She died on October 16, 2019.

Services were held on Thursday, October 24, 2019 at the Bridge Street AME Church in Brooklyn. During the funeral services, Kelly was honored by the National Society Daughters of the American Revolution (NSDAR), Society of Old Brooklynites (SOBs), Jamestowne Society, and by an Alpha-Omega services by the sisters of Delta Sigma Theta sorority.

She was laid to rest on Thursday, October 24, 2019 in Pinelawn Memorial Park in Farmingdale, New York.  Her final resting place vividly reflects her dedication to American history. She chose to rest for eternity in the Garden of Peace, off Forest Drive, between North and South Constitution Avenue.

Publications

See also
 Daniel D. Whitney
 Marjorie Parker Smith
 John W. Hunter

References

1946 births
2019 deaths
People from Bedford–Stuyvesant, Brooklyn
American genealogists
African-American non-fiction writers
21st-century American women writers
21st-century American non-fiction writers
American women non-fiction writers
Daughters of the American Revolution people
Writers from Brooklyn
Historians from New York (state)
21st-century African-American women writers
21st-century African-American writers
20th-century African-American people
20th-century African-American women